Derek Alexander Wood,  (born 14 October 1937) is a British barrister specialising in property law. He served as Principal of St Hugh's College, Oxford, from 1991 to 2002. He was a Recorder of the Crown Court from 1985 to 2002.

References

 

 
 
 

1937 births
Living people
British barristers
Principals of St Hugh's College, Oxford
Commanders of the Order of the British Empire
English King's Counsel
20th-century King's Counsel
21st-century King's Counsel